One Hundred Years of Solitude is a 1967 novel by Colombian author Gabriel García Márquez that tells the multi-generational story of the Buendía family, whose patriarch, José Arcadio Buendía, founded the fictitious town of Macondo. The novel is often cited as one of the supreme achievements in world literature.

The magical realist style and thematic substance of One Hundred Years of Solitude established it as an important representative novel of the literary Latin American Boom of the 1960s and 1970s, which was stylistically influenced by Modernism (European and North American) and the Cuban Vanguardia (Avant-Garde) literary movement.

Since it was first published in May 1967 in Buenos Aires by Editorial Sudamericana, One Hundred Years of Solitude has been translated into 46 languages and sold more than 50 million copies. The novel, considered García Márquez's magnum opus, remains widely acclaimed and is recognized as one of the most significant works both in the Hispanic literary canon and in world literature.

Biography and publication
Gabriel García Márquez was one of the four Latin American novelists first included in the literary Latin American Boom of the 1960s and 1970s; the other three were the Peruvian Mario Vargas Llosa, the Argentine Julio Cortázar, and the Mexican Carlos Fuentes. One Hundred Years of Solitude (1967) earned García Márquez international fame as a novelist of the magical realism movement within Latin American literature.

Plot

One Hundred Years of Solitude is the story of seven generations of the Buendía Family in the town of Macondo. The founding patriarch of Macondo, José Arcadio Buendía, and Úrsula Iguarán, his wife (and first cousin), leave their hometown in Riohacha, Colombia, after José Arcadio kills Prudencio Aguilar after a cockfight for suggesting José Arcadio was impotent. One night of their emigration journey, while camping on a riverbank, José Arcadio dreams of "Macondo", a city of mirrors that reflected the world in and about it. Upon awakening, he decides to establish Macondo at the riverside; after days of wandering the jungle, his founding of Macondo is utopic.

José Arcadio Buendía believes Macondo to be surrounded by water, and from that island, he invents the world according to his perceptions. Soon after its foundation, Macondo becomes a town frequented by unusual and extraordinary events that involve the generations of the Buendía family, who are unable or unwilling to escape their periodic (mostly self-inflicted) misfortunes. For years the town is solitary and unconnected to the outside world, with the exception of the annual visit of a band of gypsies, who show the townspeople scientific discoveries such as magnets, telescopes, and ice. The leader of the gypsies, a man named Melquíades, maintains a close friendship with José Arcadio, who becomes increasingly withdrawn, obsessed with investigating the mysteries of the universe presented to him by the gypsies. Ultimately he is driven insane, speaking only in Latin, and is tied to a chestnut tree by his family for many years until his death.

Eventually Macondo becomes exposed to the outside world and the government of newly independent Colombia. A rigged election between the Conservative and Liberal parties is held in town, inspiring Aureliano Buendía to join a civil war against the Conservative government. He becomes an iconic revolutionary leader, fighting for many years and surviving multiple attempts on his life, but ultimately tires of war and signs a peace treaty with the Conservatives. Disillusioned, he returns to Macondo and spends the rest of his life making tiny gold fish in his workshop.

The railroad comes to Macondo, bringing in new technology and many foreign settlers. An American fruit company establishes a banana plantation outside the town, and builds its own segregated village across the river. This ushers in a period of prosperity that ends in tragedy as the Colombian army massacres thousands of striking plantation workers, an incident based on the Banana Massacre of 1928. José Arcadio Segundo, the only survivor of the massacre, finds no evidence of the massacre, and the surviving townspeople deny or refuse to believe it happened.

By the novel's end, Macondo has fallen into a decrepit and near-abandoned state, with the only remaining Buendías being Amaranta Úrsula and her nephew Aureliano, whose parentage is hidden by his grandmother Fernanda, and he and Amaranta Úrsula unknowingly begin an incestuous relationship. They have a child who bears the tail of a pig, fulfilling the lifelong fear of the long-dead matriarch Úrsula. Amaranta Úrsula dies in childbirth and the child is devoured by ants, leaving Aureliano as the last member of the family. He decodes an encryption Melquíades had left behind in a manuscript generations ago. The secret message informs the recipient of every fortune and misfortune that the Buendía family's generations lived through. As Aureliano reads the manuscript, he feels a windstorm starting around him, and he reads in the document that the Buendía family is doomed to be wiped from the face of the Earth because of it. In the last sentence of the book, the narrator describes Aureliano reading this last line just as the entire town of Macondo is scoured from existence.

Symbolism and metaphors
A dominant theme in One Hundred Years of Solitude is the inevitable and inescapable repetition of history in Macondo. The protagonists are controlled by their pasts and the complexity of time. Throughout the novel the characters are visited by ghosts. "The ghosts are symbols of the past and the haunting nature it has over Macondo. The ghosts and the displaced repetition that they evoke are, in fact, firmly grounded in the particular development of Latin American history", writes Daniel Erickson. "Ideological transfiguration ensured that Macondo and the Buendías always were ghosts to some extent, alienated and estranged from their own history, not only victims of the harsh reality of dependence and underdevelopment but also of the ideological illusions that haunt and reinforce such social conditions." 

The fate of Macondo is both doomed and predetermined from its very existence. "Fatalism is a metaphor for the particular part that ideology has played in maintaining historical dependence, by locking the interpretation of Latin American history into certain patterns that deny alternative possibilities. The narrative seemingly confirms fatalism in order to illustrate the feeling of entrapment that ideology can performatively create."

García Márquez uses colours as symbols. Yellow and gold are the most frequently used and symbolize imperialism and the Spanish Siglo de Oro. Gold signifies a search for economic wealth, whereas yellow represents death, change, and destruction.

The glass city is an image that comes to José Arcadio Buendía in a dream. It is the reason for Macondo's location, but also a symbol of its fate. Higgins writes, "By the final page, however, the city of mirrors has become a city of mirages. Macondo thus represents the dream of a brave new world that America seemed to promise and that was cruelly proved illusory by the subsequent course of history." Images such as the glass city and the ice factory represent how Latin America already has its history outlined and is therefore fated for destruction.

There is an underlying pattern of Latin American history in One Hundred Years of Solitude. It has been said that the novel is one of a number of texts that "Latin American culture has created to understand itself." In this sense, the novel can be conceived as a linear archive that narrates the story of a Latin America discovered by European explorers, which had its historical entity developed by the printing press. The Archive is a symbol of the literature that is the foundation of Latin American history and also a decoding instrument. Melquíades, the keeper of the archive, represents both the whimsical and the literary. Finally, "the world of One Hundred Years of Solitude is a place where beliefs and metaphors become forms of fact, and where more ordinary facts become uncertain."

The use of particular historic events and characters renders One Hundred Years of Solitude an exemplary work of magical realism, wherein the novel compresses decades of cause and effect whilst telling an interesting story.

Characters

First generation
José Arcadio Buendía
José Arcadio Buendía is the patriarch of the Buendía family and the founder of Macondo. Buendía leaves his hometown in Riohacha Municipality, Colombia, along with his wife Úrsula Iguarán after being haunted by the corpse of Prudencio Aguilar (a man Buendía killed in a duel), who constantly bleeds from his wound and tries to wash it. One night while camping at the side of a river, Buendía dreams of a city of mirrors named Macondo and decides to establish the town in this location. José Arcadio Buendía is an introspective and inquisitive man of massive strength and energy who spends more time on his scientific pursuits than with his family. He flirts with alchemy and astronomy and becomes increasingly withdrawn from his family and community. He eventually goes insane and is tied to a chestnut tree until his death. 

Úrsula Iguarán
Úrsula Iguarán is the matriarch of the Buendía family and is wife and cousin to José Arcadio Buendía. She lives to be well over 100 years old and she oversees the Buendía household through six of the seven generations documented in the novel. She has a business of making candy animals and pastries which she continues until the arrival of Fernanda. She exhibits a very strong character and often succeeds where the men of her family fail, for example finding a route to the outside world from Macondo. She deeply fears her family resuming their incestuous practices as her inbred relatives tended to have animalistic features. From a strong and active matriarch, Úrsula is reduced to a plaything for Amaranta Úrsula and Aureliano in her last years and shrinks to the size of a newborn baby when she finally dies.

Second generation
José Arcadio
José Arcadio Buendía's firstborn son, José Arcadio seems to have inherited his father's headstrong, impulsive mannerisms. He eventually leaves the family to chase a Gypsy girl and unexpectedly returns many years later as an enormous man covered in tattoos, claiming that he has sailed the seas of the world. He marries his adopted sister Rebeca, causing his banishment from the mansion, and he dies from a mysterious gunshot wound, days after saving his brother from execution.

Colonel Aureliano Buendía
José Arcadio Buendía's second son and the first person to be born in Macondo. He was thought to have premonitions because everything he said came true. He represents not only a warrior figure but also an artist due to his ability to write poetry and create finely crafted golden fish. During the wars he fathered 17 sons by unknown women, all named Aureliano. Four of them later begin to live in Macondo, and in the span of several weeks all of them but one (including those who chose not to remain in Macondo) are murdered by unknown assassins, before any of them had reached thirty-five years of age.

Remedios Moscote
Remedios was the youngest daughter of the town's Conservative administrator, Don Apolinar Moscote. Her most striking physical features are her beautiful skin and her emerald-green eyes. The future Colonel Aureliano falls in love with her, despite her extreme youth. She dies shortly after the marriage from a blood poisoning illness during her pregnancy. Until soon before the Colonel's death, her dolls are displayed in his bedroom.

Amaranta
The third child of José Arcadio Buendía, Amaranta grows up as a companion of her adopted sister Rebeca. However, her feelings toward Rebeca turn sour over Pietro Crespi, whom both sisters intensely desire in their teenage years. Amaranta does everything she can to prevent Rebeca and Pietro marrying, even attempting to murder Rebeca. Amaranta dies a lonely and virginal spinster, but comfortable in her existence after having finally accepted what she had become.

Rebeca
Rebeca is the second cousin of Úrsula Iguarán and the orphaned child of Nicanor Ulloa and his wife Rebeca Montiel. At first she is extremely timid, refuses to speak, and has the habits of eating earth and whitewash from the walls of the house, a condition known as pica. She arrives carrying a canvas bag containing her parents' bones and seems not to understand or speak Spanish. However, she responds to questions asked by Visitación and Cataure in the Guajiro or Wayuu language. She falls in love with and marries her adoptive brother José Arcadio after his return from traveling the world. After his mysterious and untimely death, she lives in seclusion for the rest of her life.

Third generation
Arcadio
Arcadio is José Arcadio's illegitimate son by Pilar Ternera, although he never learns about his origins. He is a schoolteacher who assumes leadership of Macondo after Colonel Aureliano Buendía leaves. He becomes a tyrannical dictator and uses his schoolchildren as his personal army and Macondo soon becomes subject to his whims. When the Liberal forces in Macondo fall, Arcadio is shot by a Conservative firing squad.

Aureliano José
Aureliano José is the illegitimate son of Colonel Aureliano Buendía and Pilar Ternera. He joins his father in several wars before deserting to return to Macondo upon hearing that it is possible to marry one's aunt. Aureliano José is obsessed with his aunt, Amaranta, who raised him since birth and who categorically rejects his advances. He is eventually shot to death by a Conservative captain midway through the wars.

Santa Sofía de la Piedad
Santa Sofía is a beautiful virgin girl and the daughter of a shopkeeper. She is hired by Pilar Ternera to have sex with her son Arcadio, her eventual husband. She is taken in along with her children by the Buendías after Arcadio's execution. After Úrsula's death she leaves unexpectedly, not knowing her destination.

17 Aurelianos
During his 32 civil war campaigns, Colonel Aureliano Buendía has 17 sons by 17 different women, each named after their father. Four of these Aurelianos (A. Triste, A. Serrador, A. Arcaya and A. Centeno) stay in Macondo and become a permanent part of the family. Eventually, as revenge against the Colonel, all are assassinated by unknown assailants, who identified them by the mysteriously permanent Ash Wednesday cross on their foreheads. The only survivor of the massacre is A. Amador, who escapes into the jungle only to be assassinated at the doorstep of his father's house many years later.

Fourth generation
Remedios the BeautyRemedios the Beauty is Arcadio and Santa Sofía's first child. It is said she is the most beautiful woman ever seen in Macondo, and unintentionally causes the deaths of several men who love or lust over her. She appears to most of the town as naively innocent, and some come to think that she is mentally delayed. However, Colonel Aureliano Buendía believes she has inherited great lucidity: "It is as if she's come back from twenty years of war," he said. She rejects clothing and beauty which has the opposite effect and makes her more beautiful. Too beautiful and, arguably, too wise for the world, Remedios ascends to heaven one afternoon, while folding Fernanda's white sheet.

José Arcadio Segundo
José Arcadio Segundo is the twin brother of Aureliano Segundo, the children of Arcadio and Santa Sofía. Úrsula believes that the two were switched in their childhood, as José Arcadio begins to show the characteristics of the family's Aurelianos, growing up to be pensive and quiet. He plays a major role in the banana worker strike, and is the only survivor when the company massacres the striking workers. Afterward, he spends the rest of his days studying the parchments of Melquíades, and tutoring the young Aureliano. He dies at the exact instant that his twin does.

Aureliano Segundo
Of the two brothers, Aureliano Segundo is the more boisterous and impulsive, much like the José Arcadios of the family. He takes his first girlfriend Petra Cotes as his mistress during his marriage to the beautiful and bitter Fernanda del Carpio. When living with Petra, his livestock propagate wildly, and he indulges in unrestrained revelry. After the long rains, his fortune dries up, and the Buendías are left almost penniless. He turns to a search for a buried treasure, which nearly drives him to insanity. He dies of an unknown throat illness at the same moment as his twin. During the confusion at the funeral, the bodies are switched, and each is buried in the other's grave (highlighting Úrsula's earlier comment that they had been switched at birth).

Fernanda del CarpioFernanda comes from a ruined, aristocratic family that kept her isolated from the world. She was chosen as the most beautiful of 5,000 girls. Fernanda is brought to Macondo to compete with Remedios for the title of Queen of the local carnival; however, her appearance turns the carnival into a bloody confrontation. After the fiasco, she marries Aureliano Segundo, who despite this maintains a domestic relation with his concubine, Petra Cotes. Nevertheless, she soon takes the leadership of the family away from the now-frail Úrsula. She manages the Buendía affairs with an iron fist. She has three children by Aureliano Segundo: José Arcadio; Renata Remedios, a.k.a. Meme; and Amaranta Úrsula. She remains in the house after her husband dies, taking care of the household until her death.

Fernanda is never accepted by anyone in the Buendía household for they regard her as an outsider, although none of the Buendías rebel against her inflexible conservatism. Her mental and emotional instability is revealed through her paranoia, her correspondence with the "invisible doctors", and her irrational behavior towards Meme's son Aureliano, whom she tries to isolate from the world.

Fifth generation
Renata Remedios (a.k.a. Meme)
Renata Remedios, or Meme, is the second child and first daughter of Fernanda and Aureliano Segundo. While she doesn't inherit Fernanda's beauty, she does have Aureliano Segundo's love of life and natural charisma. After her mother declares that she is to do nothing but play the clavichord, she is sent to school where she receives her performance degree as well as academic recognition. While she pursues the clavichord with "an inflexible discipline" to placate Fernanda, she also enjoys partying and exhibits the same tendency towards excess as her father.

Meme meets and falls in love with Mauricio Babilonia, but when Fernanda discovers their affair, she arranges for Mauricio to be shot, claiming that he was a chicken thief. She then takes Meme to a convent. Meme remains mute for the rest of her life, partially because of the trauma, but also as a sign of rebellion. Several months after arriving at the convent, she gives birth to a son, Aureliano. He is sent to live with the Buendías. Aureliano arrives in a basket and Fernanda is tempted to kill the child in order to avoid shame, but instead claims he is an orphan in order to cover up her daughter's promiscuity and is forced to "tolerate him against her will for the rest of her life because at the moment of truth she lacked the courage to go through with her inner determination to drown him".

José Arcadio
José Arcadio, named after his ancestors in the Buendía tradition, is the oldest child of Fernanda and Aureliano Segundo and follows the trend of previous Arcadios. He is raised by Úrsula, who intends for him to become Pope. After Fernanda's death, he returns from Rome without having become a priest. He spends his days pining for Amaranta, the object of his obsession. Eventually, he discovers the treasure Úrsula had buried under her bed, which he wastes on lavish parties and escapades with adolescent boys. Later, he begins a tentative friendship with Aureliano Babilonia, his nephew. José Arcadio plans to set Aureliano up in a business and return to Rome, but is murdered in his bath by four of the adolescent boys who ransack his house and steal his gold.

Amaranta Úrsula
Amaranta Úrsula is the third child of Fernanda and Aureliano. She displays the same characteristics as her namesake who dies when she is only a child. She never knows that the child sent to the Buendía home is her nephew, the illegitimate son of Meme. He becomes her best friend in childhood. She returns home from Europe with an older husband, Gastón, who leaves her when she informs him of her passionate affair with Aureliano. She dies of a hemorrhage after she has given birth to the last of the Buendía line.

Sixth generation
Aureliano Babilonia (Aureliano II)
Aureliano Babilonia, or Aureliano II, is the illegitimate child of Meme. He is hidden from everyone by his grandmother, Fernanda. He is strikingly similar to his namesake, the Colonel, and has the same character patterns as well. He is taciturn, silent, and emotionally charged. He barely knows Úrsula, who dies during his childhood. He is a friend of José Arcadio Segundo, who explains to him the true story of the banana worker massacre.

While other members of the family leave and return, Aureliano stays in the Buendía home. He only ventures into the empty town after the death of Fernanda. He works to decipher the parchments of Melquíades but stops to have an affair with his childhood partner and the love of his life, Amaranta Úrsula, not knowing that she is his aunt. When both she and her child die, he is able to decipher the parchments. "...Melquíades' final keys were revealed to him and he saw the epigraph of the parchments perfectly placed in the order of man's time and space: 'The first in line is tied to a tree and the last is being eaten by ants'." It is assumed he dies in the great wind that destroys Macondo the moment he finishes reading Melquíades' parchments.

With his death, the Buendía line ends.

Seventh generation
Aureliano
Aureliano is the child of Aureliano and his aunt, Amaranta Úrsula. He is born with a pig's tail, as the eldest and long dead Úrsula had always feared would happen (the parents of the child had never heard of the omen). His mother dies after giving birth to him, and, due to his grief-stricken father's negligence, he is devoured by ants.

Others
Melquíades
Melquíades is one of a band of gypsies who visit Macondo every year in March, displaying amazing items from around the world. Melquíades sells José Arcadio Buendía several new inventions including a pair of magnets and an alchemist's lab. Later, the gypsies report that Melquíades died in Singapore, but he, nonetheless, returns to live with the Buendía family, stating he could not bear the solitude of death. He stays with the Buendías and begins to write the mysterious parchments, which are eventually translated by Aureliano Babilonia, and prophesy the House of Buendía's end. Melquíades dies a second time from drowning in the river near Macondo and, following a grand ceremony organized by the Buendías, is the first individual buried in Macondo. His name echoes Melchizedek in the Old Testament, whose source of authority as a high priest was mysterious.

Pilar Ternera
Pilar is a local woman who arrived to Macondo to escape the man who raped her as a teenager. She sleeps with the brothers Aureliano and José Arcadio. She becomes the mother of their sons, Aureliano José and Arcadio respectively. Pilar reads the future with cards, and every so often makes an accurate, though vague, prediction. She has close ties with the Buendías throughout the whole novel, helping them with her card predictions. She dies some time after she turns 145 years old (she had eventually stopped counting), surviving until the last days of Macondo.

She plays an integral part in the plot as she is the link between the second and the third generation of the Buendía family. The author highlights her importance by following her death with a declaratory "it was the end."

Pietro Crespi
Pietro is a very handsome and polite Italian musician who runs a music school. He installs the pianola in the Buendía house. He becomes engaged to Rebeca, but Amaranta, who also loves him, manages to delay the wedding for years. When José Arcadio and Rebeca agree to be married, Pietro begins to woo Amaranta, who is so embittered that she cruelly rejects him. Despondent over the loss of both sisters, he kills himself.

Petra Cotes
Petra is a dark-skinned mulatto woman with gold-brown eyes similar to those of a panther. She is Aureliano Segundo's mistress and the love of his life. She arrives in Macondo as a teenager with her first husband. After her husband dies, she begins a relationship with José Arcadio Segundo. When she meets Aureliano Segundo, she begins a relationship with him as well, not knowing they are two different men. After José Arcadio decides to leave her, Aureliano Segundo gets her forgiveness and remains by her side. He continues to see her, even after his marriage. He eventually lives with her, which greatly embitters his wife, Fernanda del Carpio. When Aureliano and Petra make love, their animals reproduce at an amazing rate, but their livestock is wiped out during the four years of rain. Petra makes money by keeping the lottery alive and provides food baskets for Fernanda and her family after the death of Aureliano Segundo.

Mr. Herbert and Mr. Brown
Mr. Herbert is a gringo who showed up at the Buendía house for lunch one day. After tasting the local bananas for the first time, he arranges for a banana company to set up a plantation in Macondo. The plantation is run by the dictatorial Jack Brown. When José Arcadio Segundo helps arrange a workers' strike on the plantation, the company traps the more than three thousand strikers and machine guns them down in the town square. The banana company and the government completely cover up the event. José Arcadio is the only one who remembers the slaughter. The company arranges for the army to kill off any resistance, then leaves Macondo for good. That event is likely based on the Banana massacre, that took place in Ciénaga, Magdalena in 1928.

Mauricio Babilonia
Mauricio is a brutally honest, generous and handsome mechanic for the banana company. He is said to be a descendant of the gypsies who visit Macondo in the early days. He has the unusual characteristic of being constantly swarmed by yellow butterflies, which follow even his lover for a time. Mauricio begins a romantic affair with Meme until Fernanda discovers them and tries to end it. When Mauricio continues to sneak into the house to see her, Fernanda has him shot, claiming he is a chicken thief. Paralyzed and bedridden, he spends the rest of his long life in solitude.

Gastón
Gastón is Amaranta Úrsula's wealthy, Belgian husband. She marries him in Europe and returns to Macondo leading him on a silk leash. Gastón is about fifteen years older than his wife. He is an aviator and an adventurer. When he moves with Amaranta Ursula to Macondo he thinks it is only a matter of time before she realizes that her European ways are out of place, causing her to want to move back to Europe. However, when he realizes his wife intends to stay in Macondo, he arranges for his airplane to be shipped over so he can start an airmail service. The plane is shipped to Africa by mistake. When he travels there to claim it, Amaranta writes him of her love for Aureliano Babilonia Buendía. Gastón takes the news in stride, only asking that they ship him his velocipede.

Colonel Gerineldo Marquez
He is the friend and comrade-in-arms of Colonel Aureliano Buendía. He fruitlessly woos Amaranta.

Gabriel Garcia Márquez
Gabriel García Márquez is only a minor character in the novel but he has the distinction of bearing the same name as the author. He is the great-great-grandson of Colonel Gerineldo Márquez. He and Aureliano Babilonia are close friends because they know the history of the town, which no one else believes. He leaves for Paris after winning a contest and decides to stay there, selling old newspapers and empty bottles. He is one of the few who is able to leave Macondo before the town is wiped out entirely.

Major themes

Subjectivity of reality and magic realism
Critics often cite certain works by García Márquez, such as A Very Old Man with Enormous Wings and One Hundred Years of Solitude, as exemplary of magic realism, a style of writing in which the supernatural is presented as mundane, and the mundane as supernatural or extraordinary. The term was coined by German art critic Franz Roh in 1925.

The novel presents a fictional story in a fictional setting. The extraordinary events and characters are fabricated. However, the message that García Márquez intends to deliver explains a true history. García Márquez uses his fantastic story as an expression of reality. "In One Hundred Years of Solitude myth and history overlap. The myth acts as a vehicle to transmit history to the reader. García Márquez's novel can furthermore be referred to as anthropology, where truth is found in language and myth. What is real and what is fiction are indistinguishable. There are three main mythical elements of the novel: classical stories alluding to foundations and origins, characters resembling mythical heroes, and supernatural elements."
Magic realism is inherent in the novel—achieved by the constant intertwining of the ordinary with the extraordinary. This magic realism strikes at one's traditional sense of naturalistic fiction. There is something clearly magical about the world of Macondo. It is a state of mind as much as, or more than, a geographical place. For example, one learns very little about its actual physical layout. Furthermore, once in it, the reader must be prepared to meet whatever the imagination of the author presents to him or her.

García Márquez blends the real with the magical through the use of tone and narration. By maintaining the same tone throughout the novel, García Márquez makes the extraordinary blend with the ordinary. His condensation of and lackadaisical manner in describing events causes the extraordinary to seem less remarkable than it actually is, thereby perfectly blending the real with the magical. Reinforcing this effect is the unastonished tone in which the book is written. This tone restricts the ability of the reader to question the events of the novel. However, it also causes the reader to call into question the limits of reality. Furthermore, maintaining the same narrator throughout the novel familiarizes the reader with his voice and causes him or her to become accustomed to the extraordinary events in the novel.

Throughout the novel, García Márquez is said to have a gift for blending the everyday with the miraculous, the historical with the fabulous, and psychological realism with surreal flights of fancy. It is a revolutionary novel that provides a looking glass into the thoughts and beliefs of its author, who chose to give a literary voice to Latin America: "A Latin America which neither wants, nor has any reason, to be a pawn without a will of its own; nor is it merely wishful thinking that its quest for independence and originality should become a Western aspiration."
 
Although we are faced with a very convoluted narrative, García Márquez is able to define clear themes while maintaining individual character identities, and using different narrative techniques such as third-person narrators, specific point of view narrators, and streams of consciousness.  Cinematographic techniques are also employed in the novel, with the idea of the montage and the close-up, which effectively combine the comic and grotesque with the dramatic and tragic. Furthermore, political and historical realities are combined with the mythical and magical Latin American world. Lastly, through human comedy the problems of a family, a town, and a country are unveiled.  This is all presented through García Márquez's unique form of narration, which causes the novel to never cease being at its most interesting point.
 
The characters in the novel are never defined; they are not created from a mold. Instead, they are developed and formed throughout the novel. All characters are individualized, with many characteristics that differentiate them from others. Ultimately, the novel has a rich imagination achieved by its rhythmic tone, narrative technique, and fascinating character creation, making it a thematic quarry, where the trivial and anecdotal and the historic and political are combined.

Solitude

Perhaps the most dominant theme in the book is that of solitude. Macondo was founded in the remote jungles of the Colombian rainforest. The solitude of the town is representative of the colonial period in Latin American history, where outposts and colonies were, for all intents and purposes, not interconnected. Isolated from the rest of the world, the Buendías grow to be increasingly solitary and selfish. With every member of the family living only for him or her self, the Buendías become representative of the aristocratic, land-owning elite who came to dominate Latin America in keeping with the sense of Latin American history symbolized in the novel. This egocentricity is embodied, especially, in the characters of Aureliano, who lives in a private world of his own, and Remedios the Beauty, who innocently destroys the lives of four men enamored by her unbelievable beauty, because she is living in a different reality due to what some see as autism. Throughout the novel it seems as if no character can find true love or escape the destructiveness of their own egocentricity.
 
The selfishness of the Buendía family is eventually broken by the once superficial Aureliano Segundo and Petra Cotes, who discover a sense of mutual solidarity and the joy of helping others in need during Macondo's economic crisis. The pair even find love, and their pattern is repeated by Aureliano Babilonia and Amaranta Úrsula. Eventually, Aureliano and Amaranta Úrsula have a child, and the latter is convinced that it will represent a fresh start for the once-conceited Buendía family. However, the child turns out to be the perpetually feared monster with the pig's tail.
 
Nonetheless, the appearance of love represents a shift in Macondo, albeit one that leads to its destruction.  "The emergence of love in the novel to displace the traditional egoism of the Buendías reflects the emergence of socialist values as a political force in Latin America, a force that will sweep away the Buendías and the order they represent."  The ending to One Hundred Years of Solitude could be a wishful prediction by García Márquez, a well-known socialist, regarding the future of Latin America.

Fluidity of time
One Hundred Years of Solitude contains several ideas concerning time. Although the story can be read as a linear progression of events, both when considering individual lives and Macondo's history, García Márquez allows room for several other interpretations of time:
 He reiterates the metaphor of history as a circular phenomenon through the repetition of names and characteristics belonging to the Buendía family. Over six generations, all the José Arcadios possess inquisitive and rational dispositions as well as enormous physical strength. The Aurelianos, meanwhile, lean towards insularity and quietude. This repetition of traits reproduces the history of the individual characters and, ultimately, a history of the town as a succession of the same mistakes ad infinitum due to some endogenous hubris in our nature.
 The novel explores the issue of timelessness or eternity even within the framework of mortal existence. A major trope with which it accomplishes this task is the alchemist's laboratory in the Buendía family home. The laboratory was first designed by Melquíades near the start of the story and remains essentially unchanged throughout its course. It is a place where the male Buendía characters can indulge their will to solitude, whether through attempts to deconstruct the world with reason as in the case of José Arcadio Buendía, or by the endless creation and destruction of golden fish as in the case of his son Colonel Aureliano Buendía. Furthermore, a sense of inevitability prevails throughout the text. This is a feeling that regardless of what way one looks at time, its encompassing nature is the one truthful admission.
 On the other hand, it is important to keep in mind that One Hundred Years of Solitude, while basically chronological and "linear" enough in its broad outlines, also shows abundant zigzags in time, both flashbacks of matters past and long leaps towards future events. One example of this is the youthful amour between Meme and Mauricio Babilonia, which is already in full swing before we are informed about the origins of the affair.

Incest
A recurring theme in One Hundred Years of Solitude is the Buendía family's propensity toward incest. The patriarch of the family, Jose Arcadio Buendía, is the first of numerous Buendías to intermarry when he marries his first cousin, Úrsula. Furthermore, the fact that "throughout the novel the family is haunted by the fear of punishment in the form of the birth of a monstrous child with a pig's tail" can be attributed to this initial act and the recurring acts of incest among the Buendías.

Elitism
A theme throughout One Hundred Years of Solitude is the elitism of the Buendía family. Gabriel García Márquez shows his criticism of the Latin American elite through the stories of the members a high-status family who are essentially in love with themselves, to the point of being unable to understand the mistakes of their past and learn from them. The Buendía family's literal loving of themselves through incest not only shows how elites consider themselves to be above the law, but also reveals how little they learn from their history. José Arcadio Buendía and Ursula fear that since their relationship is incestuous, their child will have animalistic features; even though theirs does not, the final child of the Buendía line, Aureliano of Aureliano and Amaranta Ursula, has the tail of a pig, and because they do not know their history, they do not know that this fear has materialized before, nor do they know that, had the child lived, removing the tail would have resulted in his death. This speaks to how elites in Latin America do not pass down history that remembers them in a negative manner. The Buendía family further cannot move beyond giving tribute to themselves in the form of naming their children the same names over and over again. “José Arcadio” appears four times in the family tree, “Aureliano” appears 22 times, “Remedios” appears three times and “Amaranta” and “Ursula” appear twice. The continual references to the sprawling Buendía house call to mind the idea of a Big House, or hacienda, a large land holding in which elite families lived and managed their lands and laborers. In Colombia, where the novel takes place, a Big House was known for being a grand one-story dwelling with many bedrooms, parlors, a kitchen, a pantry and a veranda, all areas of the Buendía household mentioned throughout the book. The book focuses squarely on one family in the midst of the many residents of Macondo as a representation of how the poorest of Latin American villages have been subjugated and forgotten throughout the course of Latin American history.

Interpretation

Literary significance and acclaim

One Hundred Years of Solitude has received universal recognition. The novel has been awarded Italy's Chianciano Award, France's Prix de Meilleur Livre Etranger, Venezuela's Rómulo Gallegos Prize, and the United States' Books Abroad/Neustadt International Prize for Literature. García Márquez also received an honorary LL.D. from Columbia University in New York City. These awards set the stage for García Márquez's 1982 Nobel Prize for Literature. The novel topped the list of books that have most shaped world literature over the last 25 years, according to a survey of international writers commissioned by the global literary journal Wasafiri as a part of its 25th-anniversary celebration.

The superlatives from reviewers and readers alike display the resounding praise which the novel has received. Chilean poet and Nobel Laureate Pablo Neruda called it "the greatest revelation in the Spanish language since Don Quixote of Cervantes", while John Leonard in The New York Times wrote that "with a single bound, Gabriel García Márquez leaps onto the stage with Günter Grass and Vladimir Nabokov."

According to Antonio Sacoto, professor at the City College of the City University of New York, One Hundred Years of Solitude is considered one of the five key novels in Hispanic American literature (together with El Señor Presidente, Pedro Páramo, La Muerte de Artemio Cruz, and La ciudad y los perros). These novels, representative of the boom allowed Hispanic American literature to reach the quality of North American and European literature in terms of technical quality, rich themes, and linguistic innovations, among other attributes.

In his Nobel Prize acceptance speech, García Márquez addressed the significance of his writing and proposed its role to be more than just literary expression:

Harold Bloom remarked, "My primary impression, in the act of rereading One Hundred Years of Solitude, is a kind of aesthetic battle fatigue, since every page is rammed full of life beyond the capacity of any single reader to absorb... There are no wasted sentences, no mere transitions, in this novel, and you must notice everything at the moment you read it." David Haberly has argued that García Márquez may have borrowed themes from several works, such as William Faulkner's Yoknapatawpha County, Virginia Woolf's Orlando: A Biography, Defoe's A Journal of the Plague Year, and Chateaubriand's Atala, in an example of intertextuality.

Relation to Colombian history 
As a metaphoric, critical interpretation of Colombian history, from foundation to contemporary nation, One Hundred Years of Solitude presents different national myths through the story of the Buendía family, whose spirit of adventure places them amidst the important actions of Colombian historical events. These events include the inclusion of the Roma "Gypsies", the Liberal political reformation of a colonial way of life, and the 19th-century arguments for and against it; the arrival of the railway to a mountainous country; the Thousand Days' War (Guerra de los Mil Días, 1899–1902); the corporate hegemony of the United Fruit Company ("American Fruit Company" in the story); the cinema; the automobile; and the military massacre of striking workers as government–labour relations policy.

Inclusion of the Roma ("Gypsies") 
According to Hazel Marsh, a Senior Lecturer in Latin American Studies at the University of East Anglia, it is estimated that 8,000 Roma live in Colombia today. However, “most South American history books...exclude the presence of the Roma.” One Hundred Years of Solitude differs from this tendency by including the traveling Roma throughout the story. Led by a man named Melquíades, the Roma bring new discoveries and technology to the isolated village of Macondo, often inciting the curiosity of José Arcadio Buendía.

Depiction of the Thousand Days War 
The Thousand Days War in Colombia was fought between Liberals and Conservatives between 1899 - 1902. The Conservatives had been "in control more or less constantly since 1867," and the Liberals, mainly coffee plantation owners and workers who had been excluded from representation, sparked a revolution in October 1899. The fighting continued for a few years, and it is estimated that over 130,000 lives were lost.

In Chapters 5 and 6 of One Hundred Years of Solitude, the Conservative Army has invaded the town of Macondo leading Aureliano to eventually lead a rebellion. The rebellion is successful - the Conservative Army falls - and afterward, Aureliano, now 'Colonel Aureliano Buendía' decides to continue fighting. He departs Macondo with the band of people who helped him oust the Conservative Army to go continue fighting elsewhere for the Liberal side.

Because Macondo is a fictional town created by Gabriel García Márquez, the exact events of the Thousand Days' War as they occurred in the book are fictional. However, these events are widely considered to be metaphorical for the Thousand Days War as experienced by the entire country of Colombia.

Representation of the "Banana Massacre" 
The “Banana Massacre” occurred between December 5 and 6 of 1928 in Ciénaga near Santa Marta, Colombia. Banana plantation workers had been striking against the United Fruit Company to earn better labor conditions when members of the local military fired guns into crowds.

This event, which occurs in Chapter 15 of One Hundred Years of Solitude, was depicted with relative accuracy, minus a false sense of certainty about the specific facts surrounding the events. For instance, although Garcia Marquez writes that there must have been “three thousand...dead,” the true number of victims is unknown. However, the number likely was not far off, because it is considered that the “number of killings was over a thousand,” according to Dr. Jorge Enrique Elias Caro and Dr. Antonino Vidal Ortega. The lack of information surrounding the “Banana Massacre” is thought to be largely due to the “manipulation of the information as registered by the Colombian Government and the United Fruit Company.”

Internal references
In the novel's account of the civil war and subsequent peace, there are numerous mentions of the pensions not arriving for the veterans, a reference to one of García Márquez's earlier works, El coronel no tiene quien le escriba. In the novel's final chapter, García Márquez refers to the novel Hopscotch (Spanish: Rayuela) by Julio Cortázar in the following line: "...in the room that smelled of boiled cauliflower where Rocamadour was to die" (p. 412). Rocamadour is a fictional character in Hopscotch who indeed dies in the room described. He also refers to two other major works by Latin American writers in the novel: The Death of Artemio Cruz (Spanish: La Muerte de Artemio Cruz) by Carlos Fuentes and Explosion in a Cathedral (Spanish: El siglo de las luces) by Alejo Carpentier.

Adaptations
While One Hundred Years of Solitude has had a large effect on the literary world and is the author's best-selling and most translated work, there have been no movies produced of it as García Márquez never agreed to sell the rights to produce such a film. On March 6, 2019, García Márquez's son Rodrigo García Barcha, announced that Netflix was developing a series based upon the book with a set release in 2020. Development was delayed but is ongoing as of December 2021.

Shuji Terayama's play One Hundred Years of Solitude (百年の孤独, originally performed by the Tenjo Sajiki theater troupe) and his film Farewell to the Ark (さらば箱舟) are loose (and not officially authorized) adaptations of the novel by García Márquez transplanted into the realm of Japanese culture and history.

See also
 Le Monde 100 Books of the Century
 List of best-selling books

References

Further reading

External links

Reading curriculum 
 Oprah's Book Club's Guide to One Hundred Years of Solitude
 Magical Realism in “One Hundred Years of Solitude”

Lectures and recordings 
 "The Solitude of Latin America", Nobel lecture by Gabriel García Márquez, 8 December 1982
 "On Marquez's One Hundred Years of Solitude" – a lecture by Ian Johnston
 

1967 novels
20th-century Colombian novels
Colombian magic realism novels
Family saga novels
Harper & Row books
Jonathan Cape books
Novels about sleep disorders
Novels by Gabriel García Márquez
Novels set in Colombia